Brigitte Knopf (born 28 August 1972, in Bonn) is a German climatologist. Since February 2015 she has been Secretary General of the Mercator Research Institute on Global Commons and Climate Change and since 1 September 2020 has been a member of the Expert Council on Climate Issues.

Career 
In 1993 Knopf passed her abitur as the best of her class at the Albert-Einstein Gymnasium in Sankt Augustin. In 1993 she began studying physics with a specialization in solar energy at the University of Marburg. Knopf earned a diplom in 1999.

From 1999 to 2001 Brigitte Knopf worked in the research and development department of PHÖNIX SonnenWärme AG in Berlin. From 2001 to 2006, Knopf was a doctoral candidate at the Potsdam Institute for Climate Impact Research (PIK). In 2006 Brigitte Knopf received her doctorate from the University of Potsdam. From 2007 to 2014 she worked as a scientist at PIK. In 2014 she began working for the Mercator Research Institute on Global Commons and Climate Change (MCC).

Work 
Most recently, Knopf's work has been concerned with, among other subjects, implementation of the Paris Agreement. She also studies carbon pricing and how it can protect the climate while financing the UN Sustainable Development Goals (SDGs).

In the public debate about solutions to the climate crisis, Knopf advocates for a price on carbon emissions. She calls for sustainable financial reform in Germany and internationally:"In addition to reducing fossil subsidies, such a reform must include an effective carbon price." She argues that revenues from carbon pricing could be used to lower other taxes.

Knopf was one of the authors of the IPCC Fifth Assessment Report (2014).

Selected publications 

 
 Ottmar Edenhofer, Brigitte Knopf u. a.: The economics of low stabilization: model comparison of mitigation strategies and costs. In: The Energy Journal. 2010, S. 11–48, https://www.jstor.org/stable/41323490

External links

References 

1973 births
German climatologists
Intergovernmental Panel on Climate Change contributing authors
University of Marburg alumni
University of Potsdam alumni
German women academics
German academics
Living people
21st-century German women scientists